The Earls of East Anglia were governors of East Anglia during the 11th century. The post was established by Cnut in 1017 and disappeared following Ralph Guader's participation in the failed Revolt of the Earls in 1075.

Ealdormen of East Anglia
Until 917 East Anglia was a kingdom, which from 870 was under Danish control. In that year the East Anglian Danes submitted to King Edward the Elder and East Anglia became part of the expanding Kingdom of England. It is not clear who was placed in charge there, but it is probable that the Ealdorman Æthelfrith of south east Mercia may have been granted authority over the newly restored area by Edward. He died in c.927 and was succeeded by his son, Æthelstan Half-King, a very powerful aristocrat who ruled an extensive territory and witnessed numerous charters from 932, and whose family remained powerful in the area.

Danish, English and Norman Earls
Following Cnut's conquest of England in 1016, in the following year he divided the kingdom into a few large administrative regions governed by earls, which followed the territorial outlines of the former kingdoms of Wessex, Mercia, Northumbria and East Anglia, roughly as they had existed in the mid-9th century. However, the exact outlines of these earldoms varied over the decades, while other, more transitory earldoms were created for particular individuals. The core of the earldom of East Anglia comprised Norfolk and Suffolk, while other shires such as Essex, Middlesex and Cambridgeshire were also included within it at various times. The first Earl of East Anglia was Thorkell the Tall, appointed in 1017. Thorkell and his family were outlawed by Canute in 1021, only to be pardoned again in 1023. His immediate successors are unknown.

The native English dynasty was restored with the accession of King Edward the Confessor in 1042. During his reign East Anglia, smaller than the other three original earldoms and not containing the power-base of any of the tiny handful of families which then dominated English politics, became a posting held by younger members of two of these great families. By 1045 the earldom was in the hands of Harold, the second son of Godwin, Earl of Wessex. In 1051 Godwin and his sons were driven into exile and their earldoms assigned to others; East Anglia went to Ælfgar, son of Leofric, Earl of Mercia. However, in 1052 Godwin and his sons returned in force to England and regained their former positions. When Godwin died in 1053 Harold was appointed Earl of Wessex in his place, and he was again replaced in East Anglia by Ælfgar. In 1055 Ælfgar was outlawed and driven into exile, but within the year he had regained his former position. He too went on to greater things in 1057, when his father Leofric died and Ælfgar was appointed Earl of Mercia in his stead. The earldom of East Anglia was then assigned to Gyrth, one of Harold's younger brothers, who held it until his death at the Battle of Hastings in 1066.

Following the Norman Conquest of England, William the Conqueror appointed Ralph the Staller, an aristocrat of Breton ancestry born in Norfolk, to the earldom. On his death he was replaced by his son Ralph Guader, who was one of the leaders of a rebellion against William, known as the Revolt of the Earls, in 1075. With the failure of this uprising Ralph fled to his lands in Brittany and no successor was appointed (though many of Ralph's possessions passed to the great Breton magnate Alan Rufus). Later earldoms created in the region were on a smaller scale. This was in keeping with developments elsewhere in the country. Whereas in the mid-eleventh century England had been administered through a handful of large earldoms covering the entire country, under the Norman kings earldoms were soon reduced to units covering only a single shire, found only in some parts of the kingdom, and before long they had become essentially honorific titles rather than positions of real governmental power.

List of ealdormen and earls

References

Earldoms in England before 1066
Noble titles created in 1067

Kingdom of East Anglia